The Inhulets is a river, a right tributary of the Dnieper, that flows through Ukraine. It has a length of 557 km and a drainage basin of 14,460 km².

The Inhulets has its source in the Dnieper Upland in a ravine (balka) to the west of Topylo village, in the Kropyvnytskyi Raion of Kirovohrad Oblast, about 30 km from the Dnieper river, to which it initially flows parallel. The Inhulets turns south, where it flows through Kryvbas Iron Ore Basin, and the Kherson and Mykolaiv Oblasts, before finally flowing into the Dnieper about 30 km east of the city of Kherson. The river flows through southern spurs of the Dnieper Uplands and then across the Black Sea Lowland. The upper portion of the Inhulets basin is in the forest steppe zone, the lower part within the Pontic steppe.

The river is dammed at the village of Iskrivka in Kirovohrad Oblast and about 30 km further downstream at the city of Kryvyi Rih in Dnipropetrovsk Oblast to form reservoirs. On 14 September 2022 the Ukrainian government said a Russian missile attack had broken the dam, causing flooding.

The course of the river near Kryvyi Rih has created many small islands, which have a rich vegetation. However, by 2017 the vegetation was impaired by the high level of contamination of the river, due to the nearby iron ore mining industry.

Urban localities located on the river include Oleksandriia, Kryvyi Rih, Shyroke, Inhulets (former city merged with Kryvyi Rih), and Snihurivka.

The M14 highway crosses the river over the Daryivka Bridge, connecting the cities of Kherson and Beryslav.

FC Inhulets Petrove is a professional football team in Ukraine that is named after the river.

During the 2022 war, between 1 September and 11 October Ukraine regained the northern third of the rectangle between the Inhulets and Dnieper and continued to push slowly south toward Kherson and the dam at Nova Khakova.

Tributaries
 Left: Berezivka, Zelena, Zhovta, Saksahan, Kobylna
 Right: Beshka, Bokova, Vysun

References

External links
 Zelenska, L., Demianov, V. Inhulets (ІНГУЛЕ́ЦЬ). Encyclopedia of Modern Ukraine. 2011

Rivers of Dnipropetrovsk Oblast
Rivers of Kherson Oblast
Rivers of Kirovohrad Oblast
Rivers of Kryvyi Rih
Rivers of Mykolaiv Oblast